This is a summary of 1989 in music in the United Kingdom, including the official charts from that year.

Summary
The very beginning of the year saw compilation albums excluded from the UK Albums Chart, and spun off into the new UK Compilations Chart from the week commencing 8 January 1989. Albums such as the Now series had regularly dominated the chart since 1983, with often up to 4 of the Number 1s each year being hit compilations. Now 13 was knocked off the top spot of the albums chart as a result of this new implementation.

In the UK Singles Chart, eighteen singles reached number one. The first was a duet between teen idols Kylie Minogue and Jason Donovan, "Especially for You", which had narrowly missed out on being 1988's Christmas number one single. The two would continue their success throughout the year, with Minogue getting her third number-one single; "Hand on Your Heart" in May followed by "Wouldn't Change a Thing" which peaked at No.2 in August, "Never Too Late" peaked at number four in October, and then her second number one album, Enjoy Yourself came in November. Donovan fared even better getting two number-one singles ("Too Many Broken Hearts" in March, and "Sealed With a Kiss" in June) and one album (Ten Good Reasons in May). The two enjoyed a highly publicised romance throughout the year until Minogue ended the relationship and began dating Michael Hutchence from the band INXS.

Like many artists this year, Minogue and Donovan were produced by Stock Aitken Waterman, who were at the peak of their popularity in 1989. This year saw the production team re-launch Donna Summer's career, and she scored her first Top 10 hit for 10 years with "This Time I Know it's For Real" which made number three and followed it up with two more Top 20 hits ("I Don't Wanna Get Hurt" and "Love's About to Change My Heart") all from her album Another Place and Time, written and produced entirely by the trio. Also, the Reynolds Girls and Sonia both got the Stock Aitken Waterman treatment with their top 10 singles "I'd Rather Jack" by the much derided the Reynolds Girls, which reached number eight in March, and "You'll Never Stop Me Loving You" by Sonia which got to number one in July. Big Fun kick-started their short-lived pop career with a Stock Aitken Waterman produced cover of "Blame it on the Boogie" which got to number five.

After a break the previous year, Madonna returned to number one for the sixth time in March with "Like a Prayer", though the music video caused controversy. Her album, from which this was the title track, also topped the charts and became one of her most critically acclaimed worldwide. The single was followed by three further top five hits in 1989; "Express Yourself" (number five), "Cherish" (number three) and "Dear Jessie" which peaked at number five over the Christmas period.

May saw the Christians, Holly Johnson, Paul McCartney, Gerry Marsden and producers Stock Aitken Waterman reach number one with a charity cover of the Gerry & The Pacemakers song "Ferry Cross the Mersey", released in aid of the Hillsborough disaster the previous month. The original reached number eight in 1964.

Two sounds dominated the summer and autumn. The first came from Jive Bunny and the Mastermixers, where several old songs from the 1940s to 1960s were joined together to create a megamix, with 'Jive Bunny' (an animated rabbit) featuring in the music videos. "Swing the Mood" topped the charts for five weeks from July, "That's What I Like" for three weeks in October, and "Let's Party" for one week in December. Unlike the first two, the latter sampled Christmas songs from the 1970s and 1980s. Jive Bunny became the third artist ever to have their first three singles reach number one, after Gerry & The Pacemakers and Frankie Goes to Hollywood.

The second was the italo house sound of Black Box, whose "Ride On Time" was the biggest-selling single of the year, and, at six weeks, spent the longest time at number one. Though the song heavily sampled Loleatta Holloway's "Love Sensation" from 1980, the music video featured a different singer miming to Holloway's vocals. This prompted legal action, so later pressings of the single featured a different singer – the then little-known Heather Small, who later went on to fame as the lead singer of M People in the 1990s. The same production team behind Black Box also reached number nine under the group name Starlight with the hit single "Numero Uno". The italio house sound continued with top ten hits from Mixmaster "Grand Piano" and FPI Project went to number nine with their version of "Going Back to My Roots/Rich in Paradise".

Along with italo, the House music genre was still going strong in 1989. Inner City released numerous house hits during the year which all entered the Top 40, the biggest being "Good Life", which reached number four in January. Coldcut introduced Lisa Stansfield with her debut single "People Hold On", which reached number 11 in May and stayed in the Top 75 for 9 weeks. This was followed by her first solo hit, "This Is the Right Time" which hit number 13, but in October, she made it all the way to the top with "All Around the World" which stayed at number one for two weeks.

The Rebel MC created a second wave house craze in October 1989 with his number-two hit "Street Tuff", and from Belgium, genre-defining Technotronic stormed to number two in November with their huge debut hit "Pump Up the Jam". Like Black Box, there was minor controversy over who was the actual singer of the track. The label officially credited French model Felly as the vocalist (who also appeared in the video), however, it was in fact American rapper Ya Kid K providing all the vocals. A third scandal involving credited vocalists also continued this year with the duo Milli Vanilli who hit the headlines when it was revealed that neither of them had performed vocals on any of their debut singles, including this year's number two smash from November, "Girl I'm Gonna Miss You".

The teen-sensations of 1988, Bros, lost momentum and a band member this year, so a new boyband took their title and from the United States came New Kids on the Block and they soon became the latest pop sensations in Britain. Their debut single "Hangin' Tough" initially stalled early in the summer, but it was the follow-up "You Got It (The Right Stuff)" that went straight in at number one in the autumn. It would stay there for three weeks, paving the way for a re-release of "Hangin' Tough" in January 1990, and the multi-platinum success of their debut album of the same name.

The year's Christmas number one single, and, indeed, the final number one of the 1980s, went to a new version of 1984's Christmas number one "Do They Know It's Christmas?". Produced by Stock Aitken Waterman, Band Aid II, like the original Band Aid, featured numerous famous music stars of the day, including both Kylie Minogue and Jason Donovan, giving them the credit as appearing on both the first and last number one singles of the year. Donovan would also achieve the honour of the biggest selling album of the year with his "Ten Good Reasons" album going multi-platinum before the end of the year.

One of the highlights of the Proms was the première of John Tavener's The Protecting Veil, performed by Steven Isserlis and the London Symphony Orchestra.  Two new works by John McCabe were also premièred during the year: Sam Variations for violin, viola, cello, doublebass and piano, commissioned and performed by the Schubert Ensemble of London, and String Quartet No 5, performed by the Gabrieli Quartet at the Fishguard Festival.  A choral work by McCabe's, Proud Songsters, was written to celebrate the 70th birthday of Stephen Wilkinson.

Events
7 January - The Chart Show moves from Channel 4 to ITV.
8 January – Compilation albums are moved from the UK Albums Chart into the new UK Compilation Chart.
14 January – Paul McCartney releases Снова в СССР (Back in the USSR) exclusively in the USSR.
9 April – The Rolling Stones' Bill Wyman announces that he will marry 19-year-old Mandy Smith, his girlfriend for six years.
23 July – Former Beatle Ringo Starr forms his own band named Ringo Starr & His All-Starr Band.
17 August – The 6th Brecon Jazz Festival opens, in Brecon, Wales. Guest performers include George Melly.
November – Soprano Elizabeth Harwood, suffering from terminal cancer, makes her last stage performance, at the Bath Festival.
date unknown – Peter Maxwell Davies succeeds David Willcocks as the President of the charity, Making Music.

Charts

Number-one singles

Number-one albums

Number-one compilation albums

Year-end charts

Best-selling singles

Best-selling albums

Notes:

Classical music
Malcolm Arnold - Four Welsh Dances, Op. 138
Harrison Birtwistle - Salford Toccata
John McCabe - String Quartet No. 5
Nicholas Maw - Music of Memory
Mark-Anthony Turnage - Some Days (song cycle)

Film and incidental music
Christopher Gunning - When the Whales Came
Michael Nyman - The Cook, the Thief, his Wife and her Lover directed by Peter Greenaway.

Births
4 January - Labrinth, singer-songwriter, guitarist and producer
28 January - Carly Paoli, mezzo-soprano
24 January - Calvin Goldspink, singer and actor (S Club 8)
17 February - Stacey McClean, singer and actress (S Club 8)
27 February - Sam Sweeney, folk musician
8 April 
Alex Day, singer-songwriter and guitarist (Chameleon Circuit)
23 June - Lauren Bennett, singer and dancer (G.R.L. and Paradiso Girls)
28 June - Lucy Rose, singer-songwriter and guitarist
29 June - Rebecca Jane, singer
12 October - Aggro Santos, Brazilian-English rapper
20 October - Jess Glynne, pop singer-songwriter
30 November - Daisy Evans (S Club 8)

Deaths
11 January - Ray Moore, DJ, 47 (throat cancer)
19 March - Alan Civil, horn player, 59
1 August - John Ogdon, pianist, 52 (diabetes-related pneumonia)
19 October – Alan Murphy, guitarist, member of Level 42 and Go West, 35 (AIDS-related)
22 October – Ewan MacColl, folk singer, 74
1 December  – Billy Lyall, keyboardist of Pilot and Bay City Rollers, 46 (AIDS-related)
21 December - Elsie Griffin, operatic soprano, 94
26 December - Sir Lennox Berkeley, composer, 86

Music awards

BRIT Awards
The 1989 BRIT Awards winners were:

Best classical recording: George Frideric Handel's – "The Messiah"
Best Music Video: Michael Jackson – "Smooth Criminal"
Best soundtrack: "Buster"
British album: Fairground Attraction – "The First of a Million Kisses"
British breakthrough act: Bros
British female solo artist: Annie Lennox
British group: Erasure
British male solo artist: Phil Collins
British single: Fairground Attraction – "Perfect"
International breakthrough act: Tracy Chapman
International female: Tracy Chapman
International group: U2
International male: Michael Jackson
Outstanding contribution: Cliff Richard

See also
 1989 in British radio
 1989 in British television
 1989 in the United Kingdom
 List of British films of 1989

References

External links
BBC Radio 1's Chart Show
The Official Charts Company

 
British music
British music by year
20th century in music